David Colin (Colon) Starbrook MBE (born 9 August 1945) is a retired British judoka. Between 1972 and 1976 he won two silver and five bronze medals at the Olympics, world and European championships. Starbrook has 4 children: Joanne, Sam, Leon, and Emily.

Starbrook took up judo at the late age of 19. He is the author of the book Judo, Starbrook style. He lives in France where he continues to practise and coach judo. His son, Leon, is also a judoka. In November 2007 at the Judo World Cup in Birmingham he was awarded his 9th Dan by Densign White, chairman of the British Judo Association.

References

1945 births
Living people
British male judoka
Judoka at the 1976 Summer Olympics
Judoka at the 1972 Summer Olympics
Olympic judoka of Great Britain
Olympic silver medallists for Great Britain
Olympic bronze medallists for Great Britain
Olympic medalists in judo
Medalists at the 1976 Summer Olympics
Medalists at the 1972 Summer Olympics
Members of the Order of the British Empire
20th-century British people